Television in Vietnam began to appear in the mid-1960s in Saigon (in the former Republic of Vietnam), with the appearance of Saigon Television Station. In 1970, in the North, Voice of Vietnam broadcast the first test television program. In the late 1970s, color television was introduced and broadcast experimentally. Today, television in Vietnam is available in many modes of broadcasting, with many national and local channels, broadcast or pay with more than 200 channels available to viewers. Vietnam completed the digital television transitions on December 28, 2020.

Television in Vietnam is considered a type of journalism, managed under the Press Law by the Ministry of Information and Communications of Vietnam, according to which the law does not allow private businesses to own television stations, but "is allowed to associate in journalistic activities with other press agencies, legal entities, and individuals. have a business registration appropriate to the field of association", allowing private entities to cooperate with broadcasters operated by the Government of Vietnam, creating the policy of television socialization.

Television is currently one of the largest mass media channels in Vietnam, as surveys show that 8 out of 10 people watch television daily. However, television is being challenged by new forms of media, seeing a decline in broadcaster revenues as well as a shift in audiences to services such as video on demand or social networks on the internet.

History

1965-1975: The beginning of television in Vietnam

In the South 
Television was first introduced in October 1959 in the Republic of Vietnam (South Vietnam) during an exhibition in Saigon. In this pilot program, the artists sat in the military microphone studio, the audience watched through two screens located in the exhibition center from 19:30 to 20:30 every day. The weekly newspaper "Cinema" published in November 1959 said: "Once a television station is established, we believe that there will be a lot of people buying televisions so they can keep up with the television broadcast programmes.”

In 1965, Saigon Television Station (THVN), the first television station of Vietnam, was established. On January 22, 1966, the first television program was broadcast, and then officially aired in the South on February 7 of the same year. Black-and-white television station with the FCC television specification, 4.5 MHz voice modulation. In the early days, due to the lack of any TV tower, the broadcast was done with stratovision (the use of a Helicopter to broadcast). Programs, including news, would be recorded on magnetic tape and then transferred onto the four-engine Super Constellation aircraft. Every evening, this plane carrying equipment leaves Tan Son Nhat airport to a stable altitude of 3,150 m at a location about 32 km southeast of Saigon, and from there flies on an unchanged, nightly repeating route at a steady speed of 271 km/h. Television waves from helicopters can be received in places as far away from Saigon as Da Nang, Ca Mau or Phnom Penh, but Saigon and neighboring provinces would have the clearest picture and sound quality.

Alongside the establishment of Vietnam Television, the radio-television system of the US Army, which was in South Vietnam at that time, was also formed. This station was originally called AFRTS (American Forces Radio and Television Service), in 1967 changed to AFVN (American Forces Vietnam Network). Broadcast in English on the 11th frequency band, it was meant to serve American soldiers working in the South. After that, AFVN built a TV tower at 9 Hong Thap Tu (now Nguyen Thi Minh Khai), which is also the station's headquarters. On October 25, 1966, Vietnam's first television tower was completed and put into use, replacing the previous broadcast by helicopter. The tower is 128m tall, where the 25 kW Channel 9 (FCC) broadcast antenna of THVN (known as THVN9 since then), Channel 11 and FM 99.9 MHz of AFVN is located. In addition to the main station in Saigon, the Republic of Vietnam also has four local television stations in Huế, Quy Nhon, Nha Trang and Can Tho. By 1972, Dac Lo Television was established, this is a private television company belonging to Catholic Church of the Republic of Vietnam and operated by Jesuits. Dac Lo Television does not have its own separate broadcast channel, but only produces educational programs to broadcast on THVN9, focusing on educational content and disseminating knowledge for the people, especially the poor.

In the North 
While the television coverage of the US and the Saigon Government in the South is increasing day by day, television has not appeared in the North at all. According to journalist , former Editor-in-Chief of Nhan Dan (The People) newspaper, Head of the Central Propaganda Department, in the 1960s, every time he went on a business trip abroad, he watched TV from In other countries, President Ho Chi Minh often reminds cadres to prepare all conditions to build the television industry. Implementing that idea, Vietnam Television Film Studio was established in January 1968, under the General Department of Information, with the task of producing television films (16 mm) for sending to the public. for foreign television stations, mainly about the Vietnam War, and at the same time prepare to build a television industry.

That year, during an international reception, Ho Chi Minh asked cinematographer Phan The Hung: "When will you let our people watch television?", because it's not enough to just make a movie to send abroad, it's a television broadcast for all to see. The government even planned to give the General Department of Information a plot of land near Chua Boc (Hanoi) to build a television station, but that was not possible.

To prepare for the experimental television broadcast, a television preparation team was established with the requirements of building a minimum television technical infrastructure, including a studio with electronic cameras, television transmitters, antennas television receiver, etc. Radio the Voice of Vietnam (VOV), at that time, has sent a number of officials to Cuba and other countries Socialist system to study about television broadcasting. VOV, meanwhile, launched several television experiments with improved radio equipments (converting two radio transmitters into one television and one voice transmitter) and self-assembled two useabled super orthicon cameras from Moscow Television (former Soviet Union), and named them as "Heaven Horse" (Vietnamese: Ngựa Trời). This name is derived from the name of the homemade gun of the Liberation Army of South Vietnam used in combatances. The two cameras, respectively, with model numbers NT1, NT2, can produce images despite some incomplete features.

On the evening of September 7, 1970, the first signals of VOV's television service has been come to transmission from Studio M of 58 Quan Su Street, Hanoi, which is the headquarters of the VOV. By the year of 1971, VOV established its television department and experimentally transmitted television nationwide, first to Hanoi city. However, due to the fierce of Operation Linebacker II in Hanoi and the North Vietnam region as well, television activities had been suspended until 1973.

1975–1990: Post-war period, beginnings of color television 
In the South, after the Paris Agreement of 1973 was implemented, AFVN station ceased to operate; all machinery and equipment were handed over to THVN9. The network of THVN9 has therefore expanded to the whole Republic of Vietnam. The station ceased operations on the night of April 29, 1975, the day before the Fall of Saigon. After Saigon fell, Radio the Voice of Vietnam and Liberation Radio A joined with Liberation Radio B in the Southeast region to take over the entire radio and television system left by the old regime. Saigon Television Station was renamed "Liberation Television Station"; aired again on the evening of May 1, 1975. At the same time, Dak Lo Television became the second base of Liberation Television Station, and resumed operation on October 3, 1975. On July 2, 1976, Saigon was officially renamed as Ho Chi Minh City, Liberation Television Station was changed to Ho Chi Minh City Television Station (HTV).

In the North, in 1976, the Television Center was built in Giang Vo (Hanoi), from here television began to be broadcast daily along with the construction of a television tower at column of 1200-metre hill in Tam Dao. In 1977, the Television Editorial Board separated from the Voice of Vietnam, established the "Central Television Station" (THTW) and moved its headquarters here. In 1976, Ho Chi Minh City Television Station experimented with color broadcasting. Two years later, in September 1978, THTW also began a limited-time trial of color television (SECAM system) for testing purposes, serving a limited number of its existing color television sets. audience at that time. To improve the team's level, Central also sent a team of 8 engineers to practice color television at Television of the German Democratic Republic in period of  years. In addition, the station also built Tam Dao Transmission Station to cover the whole North and support the construction of local television stations.

Although Vietnam uses the French SECAM standard used in most socialist states as a broadcasting standard, the broadcasting system in the two north–south is completely different: the North uses the SECAM/CCIR D standard, while the South takes over the broadcasting standard. FCC/CCIR M of the US left. Therefore, in order to manage and unify the national broadcasting system, on May 12, 1977, the State established the Radio and Television Committee (upgrading TNVN station). In the organizational structure of the committee, there is the Institute for Research and Development of Broadcasting (or, commonly, Institute of Television) to study and solve the shortcomings in the unified system of mass media, mainly in television. The institute is headquartered in the South (at HTV's second campus) to facilitate coordination with HTV to solve the system transfer to unify the Radio - Television system in the whole country.

As a regional station in the South of Vietnam under the Vietnam Committee for Broadcasting, HTV has helped television stations in the southern provinces (also branches of the station before 1975) to restore facilities. or build more. With the help of THTU and HTV, a system of local television stations was gradually formed. In 1976, Vinh Television Station was established, followed by Television Station Da Nang, which was established on the basis of Hai Van broadcasting station (under Hue Television Station). In 1978, Thanh Hoa television was officially broadcast, along with that, Vinh television was transferred to the local People's Committee, becoming "Nghe Tinh Television" (now Nghe An Radio and Television Station - NTV). In early 1979, a television program called "Hanoi Television" began to be broadcast on national television, initially as a program to serve the people of the capital, broadcast monthly, then gradually moved to broadcast daily. This is the forerunner of today's Hanoi Radio and Television Broadcasting. In 1983, Hai Phong television and Quang Ninh television were officially broadcast. In 1985, Dong Thap Television became the second television station in the Southwest region after Can Tho. In 1991, it had to stop broadcasting because of financial problems, and rebroadcast back since 1997, Lam Dong Radio and Television Station has become the first station in the Central Highlands to broadcast, and the second station in the South to have a color television broadcasting system.

During this period, the media was not yet developed. Every day, THT and HTV exchanged video tapes via air-line. In addition, via road, THTU transmits video tapes to Hai Phong Television Station and neighboring provinces, as well as HTV transmits video tapes to Southern television stations. This resulted in the national television program being broadcast several days later. Although most of the programs at that time were produced by VTV or HTV, local stations also tried to interject a few programs for local people, supplementing national programs, mainly News. local. In the first half of the 1980s, color broadcasting by television stations began to take place. VTV officially switched to full-time color broadcasting in early August 1986, instead of just the previous special programs. At the same time, HTV started broadcasting more HTV7 channels to facilitate the switching of broadcasting systems. On the night of August 23, 1987, due to lack of money to renovate the old electrical system, a big fire broke out, burning down the entire TV center of HTV. However, the very next night, HTV switched to color broadcasting and ended the black and white system, creating a new historical turning point for Vietnamese television.

Sponsored by the Soviet Government, in July 1980, Hoa Sen 1 terrestrial satellite station (20 km from Phu Ly town) along with a microwave link with the relay station at Phu Xuyen (Ha Tay) has been completed to transmit signals to Bo Ho Post Office (Hoan Kiem) and Vietnam Television Station in Giang Vo. For the first time, Giang Vo Television Center has directly recorded the color image of the daily program in Moskva. The project was put into use on the occasion of the 25th anniversary of the signing of the Agreement on economic, scientific and technical cooperation and trade between Vietnam and the Soviet Union and the opening of the 1980 Summer Olympics.. Since then, international news from the Central Television of the Soviet Union has come daily to Vietnam, telecommunications and some images of Vietnam have reached the world.

During this period, Vietnam is a member of OIRT (Organization International of Radio and Television) - the broadcasting organization of socialist countries, led by the Soviet Union. Vietnamese television is required to use the SECAM color standard, the main system used in OIRT member countries, while most video recorders and signal processing equipment at the center use the PAL or PAL system. system, with the exception of some dedicated Soviet cameras using the SECAM system. At this time, the world's color television technology has 3 standards: NTSC, PAL, SECAM, of which the most prominent is the PAL system. Vietnamese television at that time wanted to convert to the PAL system, but it was not allowed. When the Soviet Union broke up, the OIRT organization also ceased to exist, the television stations decided to switch to PAL color television broadcasting.

1990–2007: Modernisation, television expansion & experimental transmit of digital television 

On January 30, 1991, Government issued Decision No. 26/CP assigning the General Department of Post and Telecommunications to lease Intesputnik satellite to transmit radio and television signals. From 1991 Lunar New Year, the official transmission began by satellite coverage of the national television program for local stations to record and broadcast. Thanks to that, television stations in provinces and cities have had a growth in number. In 1994, Vietnamese television first explored the UHF band through the event. Song Be Radio and Television Station (the predecessor of two stations Binh Duong and Binh Phuoc) started broadcasting channel 25 UHF on September 2, 1994, leading to the response and application of a series of other television stations. This success has opened a new path for the television industry in the country.

VTV's VTV2 and VTV3 channels were broadcast in the absence of frequency bands, respectively; there were times when three VTV channels had to share the same channel frequency. As of March 31, 1998, VTV3 has been broadcasting on the separate satellite frequency, followed by VTV2 in 2001. Many local stations during this period mainly focused on relaying VTV2 because the coverage of VTV2 at that time was the worst among the three main channels of VTV.

During this period, many old provinces began to separate to form new provinces and cities; because of that, new television stations has been appeared, such as Da Nang Television Station (later VTV Da Nang), Quang Nam, Ha Giang, Nam Dinh, Ninh Binh, Tra Vinh, Binh Duong.... In the Central region, Phu Yen Television Station was established to solve the white area of television waves for the people, Ninh Thuan Radio and Television Station was also separated from Thuan Hai Radio and Television Station (now Binh Thuan Radio and Television Station).

Regarding television equipment, at this time, local TV stations often use Panasonic M camcorders (M7/M9/M1000/3000) using regular VHS tapes, and M9000 (using S-VHS tapes) & Sony camcorders (Betacams)/DVC) to film and broadcast programs. Regarding storage tapes, VTV & HTV used Ampex 2 Inch tapes to store broadcasts, the remaining stations used Betacam/VHS tapes to broadcast, in 1999, HTV was the first station to perform automatic transmission of broadcast tapes. motion. Regarding the equipment for rendering graphics through the nonlinear table, some major stations & local stations at that time had nonlinear tables, such as VTV & HTV (Amiga),.. while some smaller stations either made simpler graphics, or asked other stations/units to do it. Regarding transmitters, in the early 1990s, some local stations only broadcast with a capacity of less than 1 kW, later upgraded with foreign capital/support from major stations.

In the late 1990s, three digital television broadcasting standards appeared in the world: ATSC of the US (1995), DVB-T of Europe (1997) and DiBEG of Japan. Vietnamese television has to face a choice between these three standards. Finally, through the tests, the Science Council of Vietnam Television Station unanimously submitted to the station's leaders for signing a decision to choose a terrestrial digital television standard for Vietnam. On the afternoon of March 26, 2001, Mr. Ho Anh Dung - then General Director of Vietnam Television - officially signed the decision to choose the digital terrestrial television standard DVB-T.

From the beginning of January 2002, Binh Duong Radio and Television Station (BTV) started broadcasting the terrestrial digital television system (DVB-T, MPEG-2 compression standard) on 2 channels. 50 and 53 UHF with 16 channels. Soon after, VTC with 16 channels (UHF Channels 55, 56) appeared and HTV (UHF Channel 39 with 8 channels) was only experimental. In 2003, VTV started broadcasting 2 channels VTV1 and VTV3 according to DVB-T standard. Also at this time, BTV officially broadcast 24/24h channel BTV3 on digital, at position 50 UHF, creating the premise for television stations to broadcast 24/24h later. In 2004, VCTV started to launch DTH satellite digital television service, then provided broadband Internet service on DTH and Cable TV networks the following year. In the same year, VTC Digital Television was established and began to deploy digital television nationwide under the DVB-T standard.

Also in 2004, Teletext - a solution for transmitting information in the form of text through television channels - began to be introduced into Vietnam through Dong Nai Radio and Television Station. With this technology, viewers can access a lot of necessary information such as current news, prices, ... constantly updated on the screen without having to depend on the broadcast program of the station. This technology was then tested by Thai Nguyen Radio and Television Station in 2009 under the cooperation with Hanel company, however until now Teletext technology in Vietnam has not been developed and opened, extra wide.

2008–present: The rise of digital television and analog shut-off 
2008 was the time when high-definition television began to appear in Vietnam, with HTVC cable television broadcasting channels HTV7, HTV9, FBNC adopting HD broadcasting equipment. After HTV, SCTV and VTC also adopted HD television alongside launching satellite broadcasting.

In June 2009, Vietnam Satellite Digital Television Company Limited (VSTV), a joint venture between VTV's Cable Television Technical Center and Canal Company Oversea was officially established. In early 2010, this company officially launched the K+ Satellite Digital TV brand.

In 2011, An Viên Television began broadcasting terrestrial digital television according to the DVB-T2 standard. In the same year, Prime Minister Nguyen Tan Dung signed and approved the Television Digitization Project in order to convert analog TV broadcast signals into DVB-T2 terrestrial digital television, with the goal that by 2020 all households in Vietnam would be able to watch digital television.

In 2013, VTV piloted digital television in a number of major cities according to DVB-T2 standards and officially broadcast since 2014. The Government's Project on Digitalization of Television has been implemented since 2015, completely stopping analog television broadcasts in Da Nang City and the North of Quang Nam Province. Other localities also began to phase out analog television in the following years. At 0:00 on December 28, 2020, the last 15 localities in the terrestrial TV digitization roadmap stopped broadcasting analog television.

Since September 2016, SCTV has conducted a test of ultra-high definition television 4K on the existing cable television system, for the first time in Vietnam. 1 year later, VTC also started broadcasting programs produced according to 4K standards for free on the DVB-T2 system in some provinces and cities.

Mass media in Vietnam

Radio

The first Vietnamese-language radio transmission was made on September 2, 1945, when Ho Chi Minh read out the Proclamation of Independence of the Democratic Republic of Vietnam.

Prior to 1945, Vietnamese people were banned from owning radio receivers, and broadcasting was under control of the French colonial government, which established the first radio station in Vietnam, Radio Saigon, in the late 1920s.

Vietnam's national radio station, now called the Voice of Vietnam, started broadcasting from Hanoi just a week after the declaration of the Democratic Republic of Vietnam. During the Vietnam War, Radio Hanoi operated as a propaganda tool of the Democratic Republic of Viet Nam.

South Vietnam set up its own network in Saigon in 1955.

Following Reunification, all of the radio stations were combined into the Voice of Vietnam, which became the national radio station in 1978.

Today, VOV strives to offer diverse, high-quality programming and in every aspect of mass media. It broadcasts on many channels, repeated on Medium wave (MW) AM, FM and shortwave (SW) AM bands throughout Vietnam and the rest of the world:
 VOV1 (MW, SW and FM) - news, current affairs and music
 VOV2 (MW, SW and FM) - cultural and social programs
 VOV3 (MW, SW and FM) - music & entertainment
 VOV4 (MW and SW) - ethnic minority language programming
 VOV5 (MW, SW and FM) - world service broadcasts in 11 foreign languages
 VOV6 (MW, SW and FM) - artistic-oriented programs, currently a block on VOV2
 VOV Transportation (FM) - updating information during rush hours/ general, talks and music during primetime and off hours
 VOV English 24/7 (FM) - English-language program
 VOV 89 (FM) - health and safety consumering/all- music from morning to late midday and from late afternoon to late night 
 VOV News - a website containing news and other aspects
 VOVTV (Television Channel)- nationally broadcast which currently aimed at cultural and tourism programs
 VOV newspaper 'the Voice of Vietnam'- a printed version with more in-depth contents of VOVnews website
As of 2004, it was estimated that VOV's programs reached more than 90% of all households in Vietnam.

In addition, most cities and provinces has their own radio stations.
 Vietnam Radio Stations Online Full List Updated 2013

Newspapers and periodicals

Colonial Period (1915-1940)

During the early 20th century, a combination of French policies and technological breakthroughs led to the rapid emergence of modern print culture in Vietnam’s urban centres. Many new periodicals, journals, and newspapers were created during this time. The Vietnamese published 13,381 different
books and tracts between 1922-1940, and from 1918-1939 there were at least 163 Vietnamese-language periodicals in Saigon. Influential newspapers, periodicals, and journals in this time period included Nam Phong (Southern Wind), Phong Hoa and Ngay Nay. These publications contributed to a burgeoning public sphere and shaped political and intellectual currents in Vietnam's urban centers. Major debates centred around tradition vs. modernity, anti-colonialism, and nationalist consciousness.

The first Vietnamese-language newspaper was the French-sponsored Gia Định Bao, established in Saigon in 1869. In the years that followed, both the nationalistic and the colonial sides relied on newspapers as a propaganda tool. During the final period of French colonialism many reporters were arrested and imprisoned and several newspaper offices closed by the authorities.

Indochina War

For Ho Chi Minh's revolutionary side, Vietnamese journalists covered the First Indochina War. After the war, presses were set up in Hanoi and the basis for the country's newspaper industry as it exists today was formed, with the main Communist Party organ, Nhan Dan (The People), established in 1951.

Doi Moi - Present

As Vietnam moves toward a free-market economy with its doi moi measures, the government has relied on the print media to keep the public informed about its policies. The measure has had the effect of almost doubling the numbers of newspapers and magazines since 1996.

Current large Vietnamese-language newspapers include Tuoi Tre (Youth, published in Ho Chi Minh City, described as a "reformist" newspaper), Thanh Nien (Youth), Người Lao Động (Labour or The Worker), Tien Phong (Vanguard), Sai Gon Giai Phong (Liberated Saigon), and Hà nội mới (New Hanoi). Prominent French language newspapers included Saigon Eco, the only that currently is published is Le Courrier du Vietnam. There are other, smaller provincial newspapers such as the Ba Ria Vung Tau Daily Newspaper.

The largest online newspapers are Zing.vn, VnExpress, VietNamNet, Tuổi Trẻ, Thanh Niên, Dân Trí, VTC News, and VietnamPlus. The largest online news aggregator in Vietnam is Báo Mới.

Popularization of media in Vietnam

Culture & lifestyles 
During the 70s and the 80s, when the economy struck down, media devices were still limited, a regularations of entertaining enjoyness is still rather a foreign concept for the majority of the Vietnamese back then. Barely any family owns a TV, so the owners of these were rather substantial in those days. Back then, people from nearby neighbors would stay in these families to watch their favourite shows. Television shows, from national to the locals, were receiving support from these audiences. “The Little Flowers”, featuring performances, cartoons was one of the, if not the most popular programs for kids in the country. While for older audiences, programs like films and stage performances were well-received such as: Saigon Special Forces, Wild Field, Seventeen Days Latitude and night,...; Cheo legends Quan Am Thi Kinh, Kim Nham; Son Hau tuong, The old man carries his wife to see the festival...; drama You're not my father, Chat sanh chat boom...; the stage has Cai luong, ancient songs, drama... or foreign films such as: Three Kingdoms (TV series 1994), Journey to the West, Escrava Isaura, Simplesmente Maria, The Rich Also Cry, Oshin, Back to Eden (movie), Dream Red House,... Especially, on the occasion of big sporting events such as 1994 FIFA World Cup, Sports Congress 1995 Southeast Asian Games , Euro 1996, ... the television became a magnet attracting millions of viewers' attention.

For generations, the image of antennas has been a well-known phenomenon back then for Vietnamese people. Memories about spinning the antenna despite bad weather just to maintain the best TV signal, and static images lasted long with their audiences.

Later, when technology developed, living standards were improved, color televisions gradually replaced black and white televisions, and more and more families could buy televisions. The above lifestyles also become less and less and no more. Today, many families own no less than one large and flat screen television with hundreds of different channels to choose from, the program content is increasingly diverse and superior. But due to the strong development of other forms of entertainment, especially through social networking platforms like YouTube, Facebook, not many people keep the habit of watching television as before.

Television (TV) 
There's not much evidence about the TV's first appearance in Vietnam, although according to Thời Nay's magazine: “The TV’s first appearance in Vietnam , was 1966. It’s a Denon, with the price of 16.500 dong for the 12 inches model and 30.000 dong for the 19 inches. Although with the lack of understanding newer technology, TV - a new noun - has grown with the Vietnamese people. People start buying TV, if not then they could ask nearby people for permission to watch. Antenna grows like trees, especially in major cities. People’s favourite shows were live performances and American TV shows. Batman appears in every single damn street. Back then, electricity was really low, people had to buy a survolteur for a single TV.”

Those days, the TV with expensive prices was a dream for many families. To own a TV was like owning a fortune to those who had one, so “local villages only need a single or two TVs to watch programs.”. With the improvement of financials, comes the improvement of technologies, as TV became more accessible for people. To this day, TV monitor has improved a lot, from the introduction of LCD TV to Vietnam in 2003, or the 32 inch HD LG TV, Samsung,.... and 4k-supported TV in today's world.

Infrastructure
With the television coverage being increasingly improved, through the establishment of television rebroadcast stations in communes, wards, district television stations, etc. to continue broadcasting central and local television programs. , and there are also a number of major local Television Stations that are willing to sign contracts with other Local Television Stations to broadcast the TV program / continue to broadcast that local station's TV program on its own frequency channel. Or local TV stations race to sign cooperation agreements to broadcast on satellites, to increase coverage, along with the popular and developed cable TV network, etc. Therefore, television is easier to access. closer to the audience, through all different viewing methods: Mobile, IPTV, internet, cable TV, DVB-T2....

TV show 
Television programs, including many genres such as news, entertainment, culture - art, sports, children, science - education, reportage - documentaries..., are also a part. important to the popularity of television. At the same time, the audience's prominence and interest in the program is also based on the communication and promotion through the mass media of the station or the production unit (through advertising, press, network, etc.). social...)

Viewer Rate 
The audience's interest in Vietnamese TV shows is measured by Rating. In Vietnam, TNS Media, a subsidiary of Kantar Group (Kantar Media) (UK) is the first TV audience measurement company and once held the exclusive position of providing audience measurement index data. fake for a long time. That has led to a series of controversies about lack of transparency, Inaccurate in the ratings provided by TNS.

By March 2016, the Center for Testing and Broadcasting Services under the Department of Radio, Television and Electronic Information (Ministry of Information and Communications) announced its participation in the rating market, breaking the monopoly of TNS. This agency together with Market Research Company Nielsen and AMI Testing Company Limited established the measurement system VIETNAM-TAM, serving the management of the State. for TV channels and generate revenue from selling rating packages to stations and advertising agencies.

TV broadcast transmission methods

Analog TV 
Reference source:

Analog television has appeared in Vietnam since the 1960s. In Vietnam, analog television broadcasts on the VHF band (from channel R6 to channel R12), and on the UHF band (from channel E21 to channel E62). Only a few places use frequencies below 6 VHF (such as channel R3 VHF in Tam Dao, Can Tho and the Russian Consulate in Ho Chi Minh City). Around the early 1990s, a number of television stations in the South began broadcasting on the UHF band, typically Radio and Television Station Song Be (the forerunner of Binh Duong and Binh Phuoc Radio and Television Station) pioneered the use of the first UHF band with frequencies E25 and E44 UHF. Most analog terrestrial televisions in Vietnam use the D/K system (especially the HTV7 channel in Vinh Phuc used the M system in the period 2003–2005).

Besides, the frequency from 13 to 20 UHF is reserved for broadcasting "Military Television Program" of some provinces, such as Ninh Binh (17 UHF),... Channels with frequencies in the range of approx. 63 - 69 UHF is mostly supposed to broadcast pirated analog television in some provinces such as Ninh Binh, Ha Tay (old), Long An, Dien Bien... Previously, if you wanted to watch TV channels, interference (due to frequency channel overlap), a separate amplifier is required.

Terrestrial analog television is no longer broadcast in Vietnam after the completion of Digitalization of Terrestrial TV on December 28, 2020.

Digital TV

DVB-T 

In Vietnam, Vietnam Television Technology Development and Investment Company (VTC) started broadcasting DVB-T terrestrial digital television in 2001. This is the first unit of Vietnam to broadcast television. digital terrestrial television, creating a premise for the Government's Project on Digitalization of terrestrial television transmission and broadcasting until 2020.

In February 2002, Binh Duong Radio and Television Station (BTV) began broadcasting DVB-T digital television in the South, on channels 50 and 53 UHF.

In early September 2003, HTV tested DVB-T on channel 30 UHF, broadcasting HTV7, HTV9 and some other channels. Not long after that, on October 1, 2003, this channel officially aired and channels HTV1, HTV2, HTV3, HTV4 were born at the same time. In December 2003, on the eve of the opening of the 2003 Southeast Asian Games, the Ho Chi Minh City Television Station (HTV) began broadcasting DVB-T terrestrial digital television on the channel. 39, then channel 25, and stopped broadcasting on December 31, 2011.

In 2005, VTC was licensed by the State to broadcast DVB-T digital television nationwide.

In 2008, BTV's channel 50 UHF went down, and the station continued to broadcast channel 53 UHF.

On December 31, 2012, after 10 years of broadcasting, Binh Duong Radio and Television Station stopped broadcasting DVB-T digital television.

According to the Government's TV Digitization project, by the end of 2020, Vietnam will complete television digitization and switch to terrestrial digital television broadcasting according to DVB-T2 standard. Currently, all digital terrestrial television transmission units have switched to broadcasting according to the DVB-T2 standard.

DVB-T2 

In Vietnam, An Vien Television(AVG) started providing terrestrial digital television services with DVB-T2 broadcasting standard in 2011. This is the first transmission unit of the country broadcasting. terrestrial digital television according to the DVB-T2 standard.

In 2013, Vietnam Television experimented with broadcasting digital terrestrial television DVB-T2 in Hanoi, and officially broadcast in 2014. The current DVB-T2 television technology is being used to broadcast television on the UHF band nationwide, with the participation of transmission units: VTV, SDTV, VTC, AVG and DTV, on frequencies from 21 to 48 UHF.

DVB-T2 frequency in local 

From 2017, to make it easier for people to receive DVB-T2 waves, transmission units often change the channel frequency of stations to the correct channel frequency as prescribed by the Frequency Department and of the main station, called the network. single frequency (SFN). There is also a multi-frequency network (MFN). In addition, VTV has applied Dolby Digital Plus technology to channels broadcast on DVB-T2 since 2016.

T-DMB 

In 2009, VTV tested Mobile TV in Hanoi, completing the procedure for licensing T-DMB mobile digital television broadcast nationwide. By 2018, Southern Digital Television Company (SDTV) also started testing mobile digital television in the South.

Satellite TV 

The concept of satellite television first appeared in Vietnam during the early 90s of the last century, when some agencies and units of Ho Chi Minh City started using satellite television. Very new types of television antennas appeared for the first time on city rooftops, called TVRO (satellite television technology).

In the early 2000s, people in areas with low waves, unable to watch analog television, used satellite television to monitor Vietnamese TV channels. However, the State cannot control the content of satellite channels, and this leads to people watching programs with 'unhealthy' content. To solve this problem, on October 15, 2004, Vietnam Cable Television Technical Center (VCTV) started providing Digital Satellite Television (DTH) service, covering the entire territory of Vietnam. However, due to the high cost of renting Malaysia's Measat 2 satellite, while lacking a satellite transponder, the number of channels on DTH is not much.

After the satellite Vinasat-1 was successfully launched in 2008, HTV was the first unit to sign a contract to lease channels and broadcast broadcasts of Vietnam's channels. and many other local TV channels. Viewers can easily receive and watch many TV channels for free at the same time with higher quality instead of using analog terrestrial television with a limited number of channels and poor quality. At the end of 2008, VTC Multimedia Corporation launched the satellite high-definition (HD) digital television service, broadcast on Vinasat satellite. 1, using the DVB-S2 standard, with many high-definition (HD) programs.

From May 2009, VCTV made the conversion from Measat 2 satellite to Vinasat 1 satellite, and completed the conversion on July 1, 2009.

On June 12, 2009, Vietnam Cable Television Technical Center (VCTV), together with Canal+ Group announced the establishment of a joint venture corporation Vietnam Satellite Digital Television Company Limited (VSTV). On January 12, 2010, VSTV announced a new brand name for its satellite digital television service, K+.

In 2011, Global Audiovisual Joint Stock Company (AVG) provided An Vien Television service to all provinces and cities nationwide, through the satellite digital television service DVB-S2, broadcast waves on the NSS6 satellite. By 2015, AVG switched broadcasting to Vinasat 2 satellite.

On December 5, 2014, Vietnam Cable Television Corporation (VTVcab; formerly VCTV) officially withdrew from VSTV joint venture, transferring the investor rights to Vietnam Television (VTV). The capital ratio in the VSTV joint venture remains unchanged, of which VTV continues to hold 51% and Canal+ is 49%.

Cable TV 

Cable television began to appear in Vietnam in 1992, when Saigontourist Cable Television Company Limited (SCTV) was born. This is the first cable television company in Vietnam, a joint venture between Vietnam Television (VTV) and Saigon Tourism Corporation (Saigontourist) under the People's Committee of Ho Chi Minh City.

On September 20, 1995, Vietnam Television (VTV) established the MMDS Cable Technical Service Center. The center was established on the basis of being separated from the Program Production Technical Center, with the main function and task of developing the multi-channel microwave television system MMDS, becoming a multi-channel pay TV system. second in Vietnam. In 2000, the center was renamed to Vietnam Cable Television Company (VCTV). On February 17 2003, Vietnam Cable Television Technical Service Center was established on the basis of VCTV. On 21 November, 2003, it changed its name to Vietnam Cable Television Technical Center, opened more internet access services along with other value-added services. On May 7, 2013, Vietnam Cable Television changed its brand name to Vietnam Cable Television Corporation,

On April 30, 2002, Hanoi Radio and Television Station began providing the service  throughout Hanoi. The advantage of HCATV is that it provides cable television services, does not use microwaves, can transmit many channels. In September 2014, HCATV changed its brand name to Hanoicab. In June 2017, Hanoicab and SCTV branch in Hanoi merged into Hanoicab-SCTV Branch, managed by Hanoicab.

On July 1, 2003, Cable TV Center–Ho Chi Minh City Television Station (HTVC) was established, which is the center. distributes Cable TV under Ho Chi Minh City Television., using wireless cable technology (hyper cable technology) & wire (CATV). HTVC was also the first unit in the country to launch a high-definition television (HDTV) service in 2008.

In 2009, Vietnam Electronics and Cable Television Company (CEC) under VTC Multimedia Corporation launched CEC Cable Television service (VTC-Cable). However, due to operating losses, on November 1, 2012, VTC sold the cable television network CEC to Vietnam Cable Television (VCTV).

Also between the years 2000 and 2010, many local cable TV companies were established. Most of them have now sold their cable networks to major cable TV companies, typically Song Thu–Arico (Da Nang), NTH (Central Highlands), Quy Nhon Cable, Quang Ninh Cable, Dong Thap ...

Most cable TV networks in Vietnam use the B/G system so there will be less interference, only HCATV (Hanoi Cable Television) and some local cable TV units use the D/K system, which Analog television is commonly used, so just an ordinary antenna and a house location near the cable box can clearly see cable channels.

Internet Protocol Television 

On December 11, 2007, FPT Telecom Joint Stock Company (FPT Telecom) of FPT Corporation launched the service IPTV first in Vietnam with the name "iTV" (later FPT TV). This is considered the first step of the IPTV market boom in Vietnam, with a series of services and later types.

In the present, in Vietnam, there are 3 largest IPTV service units in Vietnam is MyTV (VNPT), Viettel TV (formerly NetTV then Next TV) and FPT Play (formerly FPT TV).

OTT 

In 2013, in the face of the changing trend of technology, especially in the field of OTT television (streaming content over the Internet), stations had a big experiment with OTT television service. VCTV (now it's VTVCab) is the first unit to officially provide OTT television services under the VTV Plus brand since January 2013, through the cooperation between VCTV and Joint Stock Company. Network Communications and Services (Medianet Corporation). This application allows viewing multi-channel live TV, separate with playback feature and especially a completely new experience with interactive TV.

Along with that, Internet companies also jumped into this field, pioneering FPT Telecom with an online TV viewing application for handheld devices called FPT Play. The birth of FPT Play marked the opening of the OTT television service - Internet television in Vietnam.

On November 1, 2014, the Prime Minister signed Decision No. 1984 approving the project to create conditions for overseas Vietnamese to listen to and watch radio and television channels through various methods: on TVs, computers, phones, tablets and other mobile devices, thereby creating an opportunity for OTT television to take a bigger step in the next phase.

2016 has witnessed a strong explosion of OTT television service with a series of applications such as MyK+ Now (Vietnam Satellite Digital Television), SCTV Vod (Saigon Tourist Cable TV), VTVcab On (VTVcab)... Besides, the participation of businesses providing cross-border services such as Facebook, Google (YouTube), Netflix... entering the Vietnamese market also makes the OTT television market more vibrant.

While pay TV services in general are showing signs of decline, then OTT television has a rapid growth rate. According to the data of the Ministry of Information & Communications, at the end of 2017 OTT television had only 720,000 subscribers, but by the end of 2019 it had jumped to the number of subscribers. number of 2.5 million subscribers.

OTT television in Vietnam currently has 4 participating groups:

 Group 1: Television content production units switch to OTT, taking the Internet as a transmission platform (K+, VTV, HTV,...).
 Group 2: Units that take content from broadcasters or produce their own content for television (Viettel, VTC, MobiFone,...).
 Group 3: Pure content production units (Cat Tien Sa, BHD, Q.net...) have strengths in entertainment programs and want to build their own applications.
 Group 4: Platform service providers (FPT Play, ZingTV, Clip TV, VNPT Media...)

To develop content, the units participating in the OTT television market are following three main directions.

 Order and purchase program copyright. The characteristics of the units in this direction are that they have a technology background and do not have content strengths, cannot produce content themselves; if any, it is almost non-identical, mainly relying on foreign programs to compete.
 Some television stations (VTV, HTV, ...) have the strength to produce television programs, holding a lot of content produced by themselves. These stations have almost available content for their channels and switched to broadcasting on the Internet platform. The strength of these units is that they own and hold a lot of copyrighted content.
 Some other units identify the central audience and take advantage of the available strong content suitable for that target group, along with some separate content on OTT. In this group, there are VTC Now, SCTV, and VTVcab.

Mobile TV (TVMobile) 

In September 2006, Nokia and VTC Multimedia Corporation signed an agreement to provide mobile digital television services based on DVB-H technology, marking the appearance of mobile television in Vietnam. Initially, users in 4 provinces were provided with 8 TV channels, including a channel providing video-on-demand services from a list of programs introduced by VTC. This service is available on N-series multimedia devices that support Nokia's DVB-H standard.

While VTC and Nokia are researching to launch mobile TV soon, the phone company S-Fone has also soon launched a TV service on the phone, as well as a service to watch movies and listen to music. request. However, the unreasonable charges make these services not used much.

After a while, VTV also entered the mobile TV market in 2010 when Vietnam Television and Telecommunications Service Company Limited (VTV Broadcom) launched the VTV MobileTV (T-DMB) service. VTV Broadcom has cooperated with Vinaphone and some other partners to provide services to subscribers using mobile information services on Vinaphone network in Hanoi and Ho Chi Minh City with 300 terminal device. After the trial, VTV gradually completed the official licensing procedure for the nationwide mobile digital television service.

Currently, mobile TV is provided by telecommunications enterprises such as Mobifone, Vinaphone, Viettel,...

Television systems in Vietnam 
Currently...Vietnam Television (VTV), Vietnam Digital Television (VTC), TV channel VOVTV of Voice of Vietnam, Vietnam News Agency (VNews), National Assembly television channel of Vietnam of Office of the National Assembly, People's Public Security Television (ANTV) of Ministry of Public Security, Vietnam National Defense Television Channel by Ministry of National Defense and Viettel Media, Nhan Dan TV Channel and People of People's Daily are national's television essential channels.  There are also radio and television stations of 63 provinces and cities across the country, prominent among them are Ho Chi Minh City Television (HTV), Hanoi Radio and Television Station, Vinh Long Radio and Television Station (THVL), Binh Duong Radio and Television Station (BTV)..., along with more than 500 radio and television stations in districts/provincial cities across the country.

TV channels

National essential TV channels 
The following table is a list of television program channels that serve Vietnam's essential political and propaganda tasks, designated by the Ministry of Information and Communications. These TV channels are selected based on a number of criteria, including "principle, purpose is current affairs - general politics or specialized content, ensuring to serve information requests, propagandizing political, security and defense tasks of the country".  Broadcasting and paying carriers are required to broadcast these channels to viewers.

High-definition television
In Vietnam, most TV channels are now broadcast with 1080i HD standard. In August 2008, channels HTV7 and HTV9 started broadcasting 720i HD on HTVC cable TV system, then a few months later, VTC started broadcasting HD standard TV on satellites (VTC HD1, 2, 3. ..). On June 1, 2013, VTV3 started broadcasting in 1080i FHD, becoming one of the first national TV channels in the country to broadcast HD television. From 2016, many TV channels have been racing to broadcast program in high-definition, such as Vinh Long (March 2016), Lao Cai, Vinh Phuc, Dong Thap, Ba Ria - Vung Tau, Binh Duong..... 16 channels broadcasting 720p: Ha Nam, Ben Tre, Ninh Thuan, Hung Yen, Hai Duong, Thai Binh, Thanh Hoa, Dong Thap, Son La, Yen Bai, Quang Binh, Dak Lak, Nam Dinh, Soc Trang, Thua Thien Hue, 1 TV channel broadcasting 1080p50 (On Sports + by VTVCab),

Currently in Vietnam, only TV stations of An Giang are still broadcasting in SD format even though it is already in 16:9 image format. Some TV channels have broadcast HD for at least one floor or more.

Vietnam Television Award 
The National Television Festival is an annual activity organized by Vietnam Television Station to create an opportunity to meet broadcasters across the country, an opportunity to select the best television productions in the world years and share the challenges faced in the development of the television industry. This festival includes many activities: judging and presenting works, organizing seminars, photo exhibitions, etc. First held in 1980, up to now, the festival has attracted the participation of hundreds of television units, including provincial, city and regional television stations, television studios, etc.

Programs broadcasting TV in Vietnam

The content of television programs in Vietnam is diverse and rich with genres such as news, culture, entertainment, science, and synthesis... to meet the needs of Vietnamese people's life.

Culture, entertainment

TV game, TV contest 

Television games and television contests began to flourish in the 1990s, typically Television Singing, Music & TV show. young people (HTV), SV 96, National Television Singing Festival (VTV), provincial singing contests, golden voice...
 
Since the late 90s, Vietnam Television has always been a pioneer in producing and exploiting television game programs, contests, etc. to broadcast on television, especially on two channels VTV2 and VTV3. In the early 2000s, many other television stations also participated in the production of entertaining games to attract viewers such as HTV, BTV (Binh Duong), DNRTV, HanoiTV... However, the most effective is VTV3 when it has created the habit of watching television of many viewers with a series of attractive evening gameshows. After that, the gameshow became saturated, TV competitions were gradually upgraded, reality TV shows, comedy, love, and music gameshows took the throne, overwhelming the prime time frame of TV channels. In the year 2019, knowledge gameshows exploded again on television.
 
In recent years, due to the weak financial potential, the production of television games at local stations is no longer as vibrant as before. Vinh Long TV (THVL) is a rare exception with bolero singing contests that help the station to transcend its influence beyond the locality and quickly become one of the most attractive entertainment channels in the world. top of the southern region.
 
For television games alone, in Vietnam, up to now, there are more than 500-600 television games produced (from central to local), including self-production, copyright and self-production. suitable for media companies to produce and broadcast on channels VTV3, VTV9, HTV7, HTV9, THVL1...

Music 
Music on Vietnamese television appears in many forms, be it variety shows recorded at the station's studio, or outdoors, or annual events or music programs. broadcast by television stations or production and broadcasting companies. In addition, there are international music programs, V-pop music... produced by local TV stations themselves.
 
The music of Vietnam in particular and the world in general is increasingly developing, the content and genres are more diverse, so the appearance of more music programs, even TV games about music is a must. an indispensable thing to satisfy the needs of many television viewers. In 1999, HTV first launched "Musical Bridge", the first interactive music program in Vietnam, creating great effects with tens of millions of viewers in the South. The program has helped the audience to be more active in entertainment on the small screen by calling and sending messages to the program to request songs or chat directly with singers. Then in 2000, HTV continued to release Instead of words, another form of music on demand but with recorded songs (until 2004). start is direct).
 
In 2002, when Vietnamese light music was becoming popular, Vietnam Television launched the award VTV - Song I love, to honor individuals, directors, producer. With the spirit of unleashing creativity to create new and attractive MVs, VTV - The song I love has won the hearts of the majority of music-loving audiences as well as the place of trust of many people. artist. The success of the program is a premise for the next big shows to appear: Golden Album, Vietnamese Song, etc. Later, many singing shows Music, live shows have appeared not only on VTV, HTV but also on local channels every weekend such as The road of music, Group of singers and young people, Melodies of love,... From years 2000, television games, music competitions also began to appear more and still continue to this day, with Tro choi am nhac, Not nhac vui,... and now it's San dau ca tu, San chien giong hat...
 
As for the variety music genre, recorded in the studio, it has improved more than before. In the 2000s, HTV pioneered the use of green screens and virtual contexts to produce music programs on television to serve the audience, combined with decorative contexts in the studio and actual filming outdoors. . Later, TV stations launched thematic repertoires, exploited from foreign channels to broadcast, especially VTV with the program "MTV".

Reality show 
In early 2005, VTV3 launched the program "Starting a Business" and immediately attracted a weekly viewership. This can be considered as a pioneering reality TV show in Vietnam. In the same year, Beyond Yourself, Dream House - another form of reality TV - were aired on HTV respectively.
 
However, "Women of the 21st Century" (2006) is really the first true reality TV show in Vietnam. As soon as it was introduced to the television audience, the program was noticed by its freshness, honesty and frankness. As a televised competition, the contestants were free to express their views and personalities, strengths and weaknesses, thereby sketching out the unique features of women today.
 
Then, in 2007, the company Dong Tay Promotion also successfully performed Vietnam Idol the first season. Since then, Vietnamese reality TV programs have been increasingly blooming with dozens of programs in genres: music, fashion, cinema, adventure, cooking, dancing,... The 2016 statistics show that there are more than 50 reality TV shows that have been broadcast on all TV channels from central to local in Vietnam.

Comedy, theatre 
In the past, many TV stations used to spend weekend prime time to broadcast the program Theatrical. The 1980s saw the peak of the comedy genre, especially on HTV, when dramas on Saturdays attract large audiences. In particular, the comedy "Indoors on the street" every Thursday night with the direction of director Tran Van Sau has created a strong effect in society; In many terms, the saying "Inside the house on the street" has become a famous saying in life. Up to now, cai luong plays, stage plays, plays, works, comedy skits, ... appear on television with all genres from satire to social life. In the comedy genre, there are Weekend Meet (VTV), Multifocals, Wary Stories, Laughing Supermarket (HTV), Comedy stage (one number of local channels), in the genre of cai luong, the majority of the operas are broadcast on local western radio stations every evening... Along with the quality, the content is increasingly focused, the comedy repertoire. brought a lot of spiritual value to the audience.
 
Regarding the television stage, in 2003 VTV launched the "Television Theater" to introduce and perform dramatic, theatrical, and reformed works every month as well as promote composing and performing in the field of television. stage. The genre of cai luong, ancient songs is no less competitive with Ancient Moon, Golden Bells (HTV)..., and a number of programs and contests on cai luong and ancient songs on local radio station.

Movie 
Feature films have appeared in Vietnam since the 80s and 90s of the last century, initially as self-produced Vietnamese films, pioneered by Vietnamese feature film studio, later by film studios. broadcast by TV stations such as VTV, HTV, and some other local television stations.
 
Since Vietnam opened up to the world, the cultures of other countries have been imported into Vietnam, so people have more options for entertainment. The feature film segment now has more diverse genres from European countries, the US, Australia, Asia ..., typically VTV in the years 1996 - 2005, with a feature film frame every night on VTV3 shown on VTV3 European-American films, the afternoon time slot for Asian films. HTV also has Asian feature films (Korea, China...) at 17:00 on channel HTV7; Besides, local stations also participate in broadcasting blockbuster films from other countries, especially in the "Weekend Movie" time frame (mainly recorded from television channels of other countries, or purchased good CDs). cooperation with domestic and foreign copyright companies).
 
Later, when HTV released the Vietnamese evening film frame, and the Korean and Chinese film trends appeared, European and American films gradually became less and less visible, only confined to the weekend film frame. At this time, HTV, DNRTV are the leading stations in the production and cooperation of broadcasting Vietnamese movies at prime time, with hit films, making an impression on viewers. Since the end of 2007, VTV has started opening the evening Vietnamese movie time frame on VTV1 and VTV3 and also created a positive effect with viewers. The Vietnamese film trend is also followed by many local television stations, broadcasting cooperation with film studios, media companies... Currently, with competition with the current trend, Vietnamese feature films is undergoing a drastic change, targeting all audiences, so there are many films that have left an impression on the audience such as The Arbitrator, Suddenly want to cry, ...

News 
"Television news" is one of the first and most important contents on television, updating outstanding domestic and international information, updating events from politics to life, society. associations at home and abroad. In Vietnam, television news has many genres such as economy, people's daily life ..., broadcast in many time frames, such as channel VTV1, HTV9 (formerly) at the beginning of every hour, some local stations & countries in golden hours like 60 Seconds, 24h Messenger, 24h Movement, East-West Movement, Good Morning... with a concise, concise, constantly updated presentation. In addition, major/local television stations also coordinate with other television stations, or units of the press, media to report, produce news, and broadcast on television.
 
Regarding political news, Vietnam has now issued a regulation that it is not allowed to associate the production of political news programs (except for essential channels and local television (with local political information and other channels, important information) For foreign news, most domestic television stations have signed cooperation agreements with television stations of other countries, major news agencies, some stations also receive broadcasts from television channels. Previously, there were some stations with world news columns, such as World Newsletter (HanoiTV), 24-hour world. (BTV1), ...

Reportage, documents 
Reportage, documentaries, and autographs appeared on Vietnamese television in the 1970s, with a variety of genres and topics, ranging from culture, discovery, country's nature ... reportage "current news", social life, economy, culture, ... Express all aspects of life, thereby exposing the inadequacies and hidden corners of society, what people have not In the 90s - 2000s, HTV & VTV were two pioneers in the production of large-scale memoirs, reportages, documentaries, which can be mentioned as Mekong Chronicles, Ky Ky. Laos news, ..., along with other famous reports produced by local stations... Currently, the reportage, documentary, and documentary genres are creating very effective effects with general public .

Sports 
The first sporting events shown on Vietnamese television have been around since the time of THVN9, notably the matches of the 1974 World Cup. Although only in the form of slow broadcast, a few days after the match ended, it was broadcast, but it was warmly enjoyed by the public.

In 1978, for the first time, two stations HTV and VTV participated in reporting the final round World Football Championship. Two years later, via satellite waves of the Soviet Union, the Vietnamese people for the first time enjoyed the 1980 Summer Olympics held in Moscow, Russia.
 
In the 80s and 90s of the last century, in order to broadcast sports events, especially major tournaments, television stations often had to ask for foreign airwaves (mainly from the Soviet Union) or receive native support. free rights, at this time the copyright issue has not been set for Vietnam. Later, when the economy is more developed, TV stations have to spend a large amount of money, even up to tens of millions of dollars, to be able to win the right to broadcast sports events and attract tourists, audience. So far, Vietnam has had the copyright of many sports tournaments. sports, including English Premier League, La Liga, Bundesliga, Champions League,... and the World Cups, the Euro of football, the ATP of tennis, or the major sporting events with Olympic, Asiad,... 
 
For domestic physical training and sports topics, there are often programs on many television channels such as "Sports Club", "Sports Magazine",..., including the program "Physical Exercise" morning" broadcast at the beginning of television programs, most notably those of VTV, HTV, HanoiTV & Ha Tay Radio and Television Station. When VTV3 sports and entertainment channel was born in 1996, this channel spent a lot of time exploiting and reporting, producing major domestic and foreign sports tournaments.
 
Technically, currently Vietnam Television and its subsidiary Vietnam Cable Television are two units with sufficient production capacity. signal provides sports matches, especially football according to international standards in Vietnam. Besides, a number of local television stations have also participated in signal production and transmission of sports matches together with VTV and its regional television centers, from V.League, First Class From countries to youth football tournaments, including Ho Chi Minh City Television Station, Binh Phuoc Radio and Televisionectronic People.

Children 
Since THVN9, children's programs have played an important role in attracting audiences, especially young audiences. Some typical children's programs in this period can be mentioned such as: Flower generation (introducing young actors children cai luong, lake... her Green Age child Kieu Hanh, children's program Xuan Phat by artist Xuan Phat, children's program Flowers of the Vietnam Scout Association, singing program Children's music Nguyen Duc by musician Nguyen Duc, Gio Khoi Children's Committee specializes in performing orchestras mandolin and dances to the homeland (by Mr. Hung and Ms. Phan at Nguyễn Tiểu La street. , District 10), the program Quiz to learn is managed by Vu Khac Khoan, in charge of Dinh Ngoc Mo.
 
After a hiatus since the reunification of the country, children's content has returned to attention and is broadcast on the air of HTV, including the program  Quiz me. Until the 70s-80s of the 20th century, programs related to children became increasingly popular, especially with the appearance of The Little Flowers every night on central television. Movies The animation broadcast in Vietnam during this period was mostly exploited from socialist countries in Eastern Europe, later appeared more series of Japanese, Chinese, Korean, Western Europe, America, etc. ... In 1996, VTV3 opened a section "Children's Corner" with the exploitation of copyrighted animated films, notably Sailor Moon. At the same time, a series of local stations have also exploited and re-broadcast animated films from central stations, or broadcast from abroad, or cooperated to buy broadcasting rights; Many animated films on television channels in Vietnam have created strong effects, impressing the audience. In 2000, the series Doraemon aired on VTV1 every Sunday morning was warmly received by the public. Along with that, children's programs, including many genres such as music and variety, have also left an impression on the audience, such as "Naughty Children, Fairy Garden" (VTV3),. ..
 
The increasing demand for children's content has led to the birth of a series of TV channels specifically for children. Starting from HTV3 in 2003 (but only became a children's channel in 2008), VTV6 in 2007 VTV7 in 2016 VCTV8 - Bibi (currently ON Bibi) in 2006, and then many other channels.
 
Besides foreign animated films, domestically produced films have also developed relatively better than before, but the Vietnamese animation industry in general is still far from other countries. animated background developed.

Science – Education 
The content of science - education (also known as science) on television has been developed for a long time and is now richly developed, including: teaching, exploring the world, the animal world, educations. In Vietnam, local TV channels often exploit documentaries, animal world... from major domestic or foreign TV channels. Channels such as VTV2, VTV7, HTV3 HTV4 have become a group of leading channels in the production and exploitation of educational programs on television. With programs exploited from abroad, VTV and HTV have signed cooperation agreements with many major television companies in the world to broadcast on their channels.
 
Regarding educational content, in Vietnam today, there are many television stations from central to local levels that produce programs of various genres: teaching, vocational education, sex education, education & training ..., as well as thematic, local education reports every week. and educational reports, vocational education and training programs... In the 1990s, VTV & HTV launched the program "Teaching foreign languages on television", with the curriculum Follow Me. of the BBC. In 1996, VTV launched the program "Teaching remotely" on the MMDS system and created a lot of buzz on Vietnamese television. This program along with the program College Exam Preparation on channel VTV2 and VTV7 has directly served students preparing for university exams, In addition, on television, there are many teaching and vocational programs according to fields and audiences.

Topics, categories

Arts 
Culture is an indispensable part of television in Vietnam, including Children's Arts, culture and society.... In Vietnam, programs like "Art Magazine" of HTV, VTV's "Sunday Arts", or other cultural and artistic magazine programs of local stations have shown and reflected the entertainment and cultural life. art, literature and art .... of the people and society.

Life, synthesis 
Topics such as the National Assembly, politics, literature and art, civil society, general, ... are produced by television stations or affiliates. These can be mentioned as socio-political topics, including "Events and Comments, Speak Together, A Whole World" (VTV), "Speak & Do, Listen & Communicate" (HTV),...; There are "Financial Economics" (HTV), "Weekend Economic Review" (VTV), "On the road to integration" (HanoiTV)... Some categories like Television Mailbox (VTV and local stations) was also set up to answer questions and opinions of the audience on civil and social issues. Programs of this type contribute to honestly and objectively reflect the people's opinions and aspirations, and at the same time provide life knowledge to the audience.

Health, health 
A number of medical and health programs attract the attention of the audience, especially on major local stations and central television, providing viewers with information, discussion and analysis on major topics. medical and health topics, such as the news bulletin Health 24h (VTV1), gameshow Vitamin (HanoiTV)... along with topics, health programs on other local stations.

Other

Base TV (Local Site) 
Grassroots television is a form of news about the situation of life, politics, society, culture and people's livelihood of one or more districts of a province, produced by district radio and television stations, and usually broadcast on local television. Previously, VTV1 had the program "Local Page", reporting on the situation of political, social, cultural and people's lives of the provinces and cities, produced and recorded by the radio and television stations of those provinces. and send it to Vietnam Television for broadcasting.

Security/Military Television 
These are specialized programs, reflecting the activities of the police and military units nationwide in general and local in particular, as well as meeting the requirements of extensive propaganda and promotion of the law. building the armed forces and protecting Fatherland in the new period.
 
Currently, the Army Radio and Television Center (under the Ministry of Defense) and the People's Public Security Communications Department (under the Ministry of Public Security) are the units that produce specialized programs on national security and national security. room, broadcast on channels VTV1, VTV2 & VTV3 of Vietnam Television Station. In addition, the units under the Military Zones and the Public Security of the provinces also coordinate with many local radio and television stations to produce and broadcast these specialized programs.

TV commercial 
Television advertising (film commercials) is an indispensable factor, generating revenue for television stations through the sale of advertisements in television programs. In Vietnam, there is a rule drawn that the more the program attracts the audience, the higher the viewership rate, the more advertising will be at a higher price. A survey from 2003 in Ho Chi Minh City shows that the percentage of people watching television just to watch ads accounts for about 20 - 30%, so promotional videos are developed more and more eye-catching and bright create and present diverse, rich and novel.
 
However, many ads that have been broadcast on television have brought negative effects to viewers, nearly This is the advertisement for Tiger Zebra energy drink broadcast in early 2020.

TV status in Vietnam

Technical 

Currently, television stations across the country have applied automatic broadcasting system (server), digital broadcasting system.... to accommodate more and more programs and production. Regarding broadcasting and video recording equipment, television stations have invested and renewed, upgraded filming and broadcasting equipment, and even invested in human resources... suitable for all types of operations and current production conditions. In addition, television stations are equipped with color vehicles (mobile television). modern to serve the operation, live broadcast of events on a local / national scale.

Image Quality 

Most local TV channels across the country are currently broadcasting with a 16:9 aspect ratio, the highest picture quality is 576i (720p), of which more than 80% have broadcast HD, quality The picture quality reaches 1080i50 (with DVB-T2 and other infrastructures), with OTT and IPTV units also applying HEVC.

Coverage 

Currently, with most TV stations from local to central, the audience can easily access it, not only via DVB-T2 waves, via cable, digital, and satellite TV (free of charge). , paid)... but also through digital platforms such as OTT, IPTV... To increase coverage, television stations also cooperate with OTT management units, cable television units, television provider...even create your own app to put your channel and broadcasts, serving domestic & foreign audiences.

TV program quality 

Currently, the quality of television programs of major television stations is markedly different from those of local stations. Major television stations have large budgets to invest in improving the quality of content, attracting units to socialize program production, purchase rights, broadcast cooperation, and exploit advertising. However, because they depend a lot on "socialization", major broadcasters often have difficulty in censoring, managing the format and production of the above socialization units, so on the media The picture has appeared a number of programs with similar formats, or the content is not suitable for the audience. TV games, reality TV shows are often the programs that get the most reaction from the audience.

As for the local stations, in general the programs are almost less interested. Some local stations, due to financial and investment difficulties, can only produce programs with fairly simple staging (typically stations in the Northwest, North Central and Central Highlands), a Some other stations have shown signs of decline in content after a peak period such as Hanoi, Hai Phong , Khanh Hoa, Da Nang... However, many stations have also invested in quality and content. program content, synchronous quality of images and content, such as Hau Giang, Vinh Long, Dong Thap, even become competitors with major broadcasters. Entertainment programs and feature films are acquired by local stations from socialization cooperation units, broadcasting cooperation with major television stations such as VTV, HTV, THVL...

Currently, in the orientation of most television stations, the goal is to improve the quality of broadcast programs on television.

Financial autonomy 

At major television stations, in 1994, HTV became the first unit in the field of radio and television to be financially self-sufficient and gradually abolished the subsidy system. Since 2008, VTV has also implemented a financial, labor and salary management mechanism like a state-owned enterprise.

Unlike major stations, most local TV stations still have to depend on the state budget and receive the main funding, except for a few stations that have been done for a long time like Vinh Long in 2001. From the beginning of 2021, all radio and television stations strive to self-finance their regular operating expenses.

TV show production

Socialize 

Currently, in order to take advantage of advertising revenue, TV stations often associate with media companies, units and collectives to produce programs, through the exchange of buying and selling ads, studio expenses,... After the broadcast ends, the advertising revenue will be divided according to the agreed ratio between the broadcaster and the production partner to pay the cost of copyright, production,... Not only stop In program production, many units also buy airtime of some channels to exploit, even rent broadcast channels. The most common method at present is for the business unit to pay the television station an amount equivalent to one year of operation (agreed by the two parties), the content of the unit's own planning, the program framework, and then the delivery of the program. for the station to review before broadcasting.

Such socialization of television has helped to create programs of good quality that leave a deep impression on television viewers. However, there are many conflicting opinions on this issue. The most prominent is the fact that some programs, inappropriate, objectionable content, or regularly invite celebrities to participate in the program to earn ratings and advertising has created a backlash for viewers.

Buy copyright 

Previously, TV stations in the North in particular and across the country in general impressed the audience through Asian films. To achieve this, television stations often sign contracts with companies providing copyright, even some stations also receive broadcasts from abroad, compile, interpret and broadcast (at this time the issue of copyright is not the same). has not been taken into account). For entertainment programs from abroad, production companies will buy them from other countries and then produce them together with television stations; Meanwhile, at local stations, there is often a "Foreign entertainment" section with the reception and exploitation of programs from foreign TV channels to broadcast.

Currently, due to the increasing tightening of copyright, the situation of piracy from television channels has gradually decreased, so local stations now mostly replay feature films from major TV channels. combine playback, or exploit new movies. As for the general, special, and entertainment programs of major stations, these stations sign contracts with companies that produce such programs and broadcast them.

Self-produced 

Most TV stations now do a relatively good job of self-production, but not many people are interested. In order to improve the quality of content and technology, television stations have invested a lot of technical equipment, such as color vehicles, cameras, studios, and human resources. After completing television digitization, In 2020, TV stations now only focus on producing and broadcasting programs.

Compete with online platforms 

Currently, with the development of the internet, and video viewing applications & social networks such as YouTube, TikTok, Facebook... or watching movies like Galaxy Play, Netflix.... , along with the need for convenience and viewers' preferences for "watching TV shows on youtube and social platforms". Currently, Vietnam Television is competing with online platforms, from catching up with all audiences, building online viewing applications, investing in video stores, uploading programs/live streams online. YouTube/Facebook, fast news, compete with other platforms... To attract and reach more audiences.

Copyright

Sports copyright 

Currently, the copyright of international sports tournaments in Vietnam is mostly in the hands of pay television units, such as VTVCab, SCTV, K+,... through media and exploitation units. copyright, some domestic sports tournaments such as V-League held by VTV & VTVCab, AVG, VTC (formerly), and local stations through Next Media & VPF, matches of the Vietnamese team owned by media units, broadcasting cooperation with major domestic TV channels.

Copyright of TV shows/broadcasting and sports channels 
In the past, pay TV units and terrestrial digital televisions broadcast foreign TV channels, but most of these channels do not have a license from the Ministry of Information and Communications, most of which are collected from the Ministry of Information and Communications. satellite/sentence from television services of neighboring countries for broadcasting transmission. As for programs buy copyright, piracy is currently a hot topic, and also a headache for major broadcasters. Previously, in Vietnam, it also happened. cases similar to the case of loss of copyright of Miss contests, or more recently, copyright UEFA Champions League of VTVCab, English Premier League of K+...

Currently, pay TV units have tightened their grip on the copyright issue of foreign TV channels, when currently foreign TV channels in Vietnam are operated by intermediaries. exploitation, translation, content control and resale to television units. As for television piracy, it is still a burning problem for television stations and pay television units in Vietnam, especially television programs, major sports tournaments, .... with all kinds and forms such as livestream, illegal transmission of signals, etc. on social networks by all tricks, causing huge damage to TV stations, partners, pay TV units. Therefore, tightening in the issue of copyright TV shows, TV series, sports... is an inevitable issue today, with tougher measures, with the attention of the Ministry of Information and Communications and the audience, in order to reverse piracy in many forms, contributing to a healthier copyright environment.

Other

Image

Most viewed channels

See also

Censorship in Vietnam
Communications in Vietnam
Culture of Vietnam
Television in Vietnam (Vietnamese language)
Vietnam Television
Sports broadcasting contracts in Vietnam

References

External links 

https://vnexpress.net/tu-1-7-lan-dau-tien-phat-song-truyen-hinh-so-mat-dat-1968753.html
https://vnexpress.net/tram-su-do-dau-ang-ten-1475185.html
https://vnexpress.net/can-than-khi-mua-dau-thu-ky-thuat-so-1500940.html
http://hanoimoi.com.vn/ban-in/Xa-hoi/347631/ban-song-ban-kenh-that-thu-tien-ty
http://www.htv.com.vn/su-dau-tu-cua-htv-trong-ky-thuat-dung-va-cong-nghe-dung-cac-chuong-trinh-truyen-hinh
https://toc.123docz.net/document/487802-1-xa-hoi-hoa-san-xuat-chuong-trinh-truyen-hinh-tren-song-cua-htv.htm
https://ajc.hcma.vn/UserControls/Publishing/News/BinhLuan/pFormPrint.aspx?UrlListProcess=/content/tintuc/Lists/News&ItemID=3081&IsTA=False